Ogcodes zonatus is a species of insect in the family Acroceridae, the small-headed flies.

Distribution
This species is present in Europe, Russia, Turkey, Iran, Algeria and Mongolia.

Description
These flies are characterized by a globular body, very small and dark heads and by translucent wings. The contiguous eyes occupy in both sexes the entire head. A long ventral proboscis is present only in the feeding imagos. The domed thorax is black, with partly brown hairs, where as the abdomen has black and white transversal bands. The rear pair of legs is curved, thickened at the end, with a brown colour.

This species is very similar to Ogcodes pallipes, that has monocolor femurs, and to Ogcodes gibbosus, that shows different shapes of the bands on tergites, yellowish halteres knob and transparent margin of the calypter.

Biology
Adults are active from June to August. This species is a parasitoid of Salticidae spiders (Heliophanus species).

References

External links

 Insectarium Virtual
 Galerie Insecte
 Les insectes

Acroceridae
Insects described in 1840
Diptera of Europe
Diptera of Asia
Taxa named by Wilhelm Ferdinand Erichson